Max Koecher (20 January 1924 in Weimar – 7 February 1990, Lengerich) was a German mathematician.

Biography
Koecher studied mathematics and physics at the Georg-August-Universität in Göttingen.
In 1951, he received his doctorate under Max Deuring with his work  on Dirichlet series with functional equation where he introduced Koecher–Maass series.  He qualified in 1954 at the Westfälische Wilhelms University in Münster.  From 1962 to 1970, Koecher was department chair at the University of Munich. He retired in 1989.

His main research area was the theory of Jordan algebras, where he introduced the Kantor–Koecher–Tits construction and the Koecher–Vinberg theorem.  He discovered the  Koecher boundedness principle in the theory of Siegel modular forms.

References

External links

Max Koecher on Wikimedia Commons

20th-century German mathematicians
1990 deaths
1924 births